Yawalapiti (Jaulapiti) is an Arawakan language of Brazil. The Agavotaguerra (Agavotoqueng) reportedly spoke the same language. Speakers of the language live in a village along the edge of the river Tuatuari, a tributary of the Kuluene River, located in the southern part of the Xingu Indigenous Park (Upper Xingu), in the state of Mato Grosso.

Phonology

Consonants
Yawalapiti and Waurá, an Arawakan language belonging to the same subgroup, share a very similar phonemic inventory. The main segments are classified in the following table.

There are no voiced plosives or affricates in the language. The palatal  appears to be an allophone of  occurring before the front vowel , e.g. [puˈluka] "countryside" vs. [naˈciɾu] "my aunt". Also, the fricative  is in free variation with its voiced counterpart and  respectively, e.g. [iˈʂa ~ iˈʐa] "canoe".

There are also some phonotactic constraints that dictate what types of consonants are allowed to appear in certain positions inside a word. For instance, the sounds  cannot occur before the vowel , and the latter two are restricted to the medial position. In a similar manner, the liquid  is only observed in medial position and never before . As for the voiceless , it is the only rhotic segment that is allowed to appear in any position and before any vowel. The semivowel  is found in initial, medial and final position, while  does not occur in final position.

Vowels
The Yawalapiti language has both oral and nasal vowels, as shown below.

Although nasal vowels mostly occur before or after nasal consonants, e.g.  "pequi oil" or  "termite", there are cases in which they are found in non-nasal environments, e.g.  (emphatic particle). Simple vowels can form various diphthongs, mainly .

Contrary to Waurá, Yawalapiti has no  sound. This is because Proto-Arawak *e has evolved as  while, at the same time, Proto-Arawak *i and *ɨ have merged resulting into  in Yawalapiti.

Phonotactics
Syllables in Yawalapiti can be of the type V, CV and, only in word-final position, (C)Vʔ. The stress may fall on the penultimate or on the last syllable of a word.

Morphology

Classifiers and derivational suffixes
As other Arawakan languages, Yawalapiti is agglutinative and makes use of affixes, especially suffixes, to convey basic grammatical relations. Nominal suffixes can be divided into two groups: classifiers and derivational suffixes.

The main classifiers found in Yawalapiti refer to the shape of an object or some other characteristic of it, like texture, length and position.

These morphemes attach to adjectives when they refer to a noun that needs a classifier, as in the following example.

Derivational suffixes are applied to primitive nouns to form new compound nouns. Sometimes, however, the meaning of the original noun is not known.

Possessives
Nominal and verbal prefixes intervene in the formation of possessive phrases, and can indicate the subject or the object of a verb phrase. The set of possessive prefixes of Yawalapiti is very similar to the those of the other languages of the Arawakan branch.

In vowel initial nouns and verbs, the forms ni- and pi- are frequently used with roots beginning in u, while the prefix aw- appears systematically before a. In nouns and verbs beginning in consonant, the form ti- occurs only when the root starts with h (in all the other cases, hi- is used). The third person plural is actually a circumfix formed by the correspondent prefix of the third person singular and the pluralizer suffix -pa. When nouns beginning with p, k, t, m, n, w and j are modified by the prefix of second person singular or plural, their initial sounds are subject to the following morphophonemic changes.

 p → ɾ
 k → tʃ
 t → ts
 m → ɲ
 n → ɲ
 w → Ø
 j → Ø

Thus, for example, -kuʃu "head" becomes hi-tʃuʃu "your head" (but nu-kuʃu "my head"), -palaka "face" becomes hi-ɾalaka "your face" (but nu-palata "my face") and -jakanati "saliva" becomes hi-akanati "your saliva" (but nu-jakanati "my saliva").

Apart from possessive prefixes, alienable nouns also receive alienable possessive suffixes, as in the case of uku "arrow", which becomes n-uku-la "my arrow", p-uku-la "your arrow", in-uku-la "his/her arrow", etc.

Independent pronouns
Independent pronouns of first and second person are listed in the table below.

For the third person, Yawalapiti speakers use demonstrative pronouns, which are also marked for gender.

Syntax
From a typological point of view, the order of constituents in Yawalapiti is SVO. In genitive constructions, the possessor precedes the possessed item. The same is true for other modifiers, especially demonstratives and numerals, while adjectives are free to occur before or after their referent.

Notes

References

Further reading
Carvalho, Fernando O. de. 2016. Internal and Comparative Reconstruction in Yawalapiti: Palatalization and Rule Telescoping. International Journal of American Linguistics 82 (3).

Arawakan languages
Languages of Xingu Indigenous Park